The M Countdown Chart is a record chart on the South Korean Mnet television music program M Countdown. Every week, the show awards the best-performing single on the chart in the country during its live broadcast.

In 2016, 36 singles achieved a number one on the show and 27 music acts were awarded first-place trophies. Six songs collected trophies for three weeks and achieved a triple crown: "Daddy" by Psy, "Dumb & Dumber" by iKon, "Rough" and "Navillera" by GFriend, "Cheer Up" by Twice, and "Monster" by Exo. No release for the year earned a perfect score, but "Monster" acquired the highest point total on the June 23 broadcast with 10,849 points.

Scoring system  
Songs were judged based on a combination of digital music sales (50%), album sales (15%), social media performance (official YouTube music video views and SNS buzz: 15%), popularity (global fan votes and age range preference: 10%), Mnet's broadcast score (10%), and a live SMS vote (10%) that took place during the show, for a total of 11,000 points.

Chart history

References

2016 in South Korean music
2016 record charts
Lists of number-one songs in South Korea